Marek Matějovský (born 20 December 1981) is a Czech footballer who plays for FK Mladá Boleslav as a central midfielder.

Club career

Early career
Matějovský started his football career at the age of five with Slavoj Stará Boleslav, progressing to Alfa Brandýs nad Labem at the age of 13. After turning 18, he signed professional terms with Mladá Boleslav for the 1999–2000 season, who were then playing in the Czech 2. Liga. In the spring of 2001, he switched to Gambrinus liga team Jablonec, but returned to Mladá Boleslav in January 2003. After settling back into the team, he helped them win promotion to the Gambrinus liga for the start of the 2004–05 season, where they remained for the rest of Matějovský's stay at the club. He was promoted to captain of Mladá Boleslav at the start of the 2005–06 season.

Reading
Matějovský's performances in the Czech Republic alerted big clubs elsewhere in Europe to his ability, and he was linked with moves to Liverpool, Hamburg and Steaua Bucharest. However, it was announced on 7 January 2008 that Reading had signed Matějovský on a three-and-a-half-year contract for an undisclosed fee, believed to be around £1.42 million.

Nick Hammond said, "Marek is primarily a central midfield player but he is also capable of playing in both wide positions or behind the strikers – he is a player we have been following for some time, and when the opportunity arose to sign him it was too good to turn down." Brian McDermott kept an eye on him for roughly 18 months, and had seen him in action a number of times. He said "He's captain of his club, and has played all their games in the last three years except when he's been suspended. That's the type of guy he is."

He made his debut for Reading on 19 January in a 2–0 home defeat to Manchester United, coming on as an 80th-minute substitute for Bobby Convey. His first start for Reading was in another 2–0 home defeat, this time to Bolton Wanderers on 2 February. Matějovský scored his first goal for Reading on 15 March, with a 20-yard effort in a 2–1 loss at Liverpool. Two weeks later, he was sent off in a goalless draw against Blackburn Rovers at the Madejski Stadium. He totalled 15 appearances in his first season, which ended with relegation to the Championship.

Sparta Prague
Matějovský returned to the Czech Republic in 2010, joining Sparta Prague and was announced as the new club captain ahead of the 2011–12 Gambrinus liga, taking over from Tomáš Řepka.

International career

Matějovský was capped 15 times by the Czech Republic national football team. Karel Brückner first called him up as a replacement for the injured David Jarolím for the Czech Republic's Euro 2008 qualifier against Wales on 2 September 2006, but had to wait until 7 February 2007 to make his international debut as a 70th-minute substitute in a friendly with Belgium, coming on for Tomáš Galásek and assisting the second goal in a 2–0 win.

He scored his only international goal in the Czech Republic's 3–0 win over Germany in Munich, also hitting the post, to cement their place at Euro 2008. He started the second and third group games at the Euro 2008 but was taken off with an injury against Turkey.

Personal life
Matějovský married in the summer of 2007. Outside football, he is also a keen ice hockey player.

Career statistics

International

Statistics accurate as of match played 18 November 2009

International goals

Honours
Sparta Prague
Czech First League: 2013–14
Czech Cup: 2013–14
Czech Supercup: 2010, 2014

References

External links

 
 
 Profile at iDNES.cz
 Marek Matějovský profile at readingfc.co.uk
 

1981 births
Living people
People from Brandýs nad Labem-Stará Boleslav
Czech footballers
Czech Republic international footballers
Association football midfielders
FK Mladá Boleslav players
FK Jablonec players
AC Sparta Prague players
Reading F.C. players
Premier League players
English Football League players
UEFA Euro 2008 players
Czech First League players
Czech expatriate footballers
Expatriate footballers in England
Czech expatriate sportspeople in England
Sportspeople from the Central Bohemian Region